The MC Oran–USM Alger rivalry is a football rivalry between Oran-based MC Oran and USM Alger of Algiers. The two teams have a total of 31 titles from the Ligue Professionnelle 1, Algerian Cup, League Cup and Super Cup at the local level, Regionally the Arab Champions League, the Arab Cup Winners' Cup and the Arab Super Cup, both of which do not have continental titles and the best participation was the final of the CAF Champions League once for each club.

History

Early years

Mouloudia Club Oranais is an Algerian professional football club based in Oran. The club was founded on 1917 in Medina Jedida as Mouloudia Club Musulman Oranais, but the declaration was approved by the French authorities on 4 December 1919 after changing the home place of the club, he stopped his sports activities during the Second World War (1939-1945) and restarted it by forming the club in El Hamri in 1946 as Mouloudia Club Oranais. As for Union sportive de la médina d'Alger based in Algiers. The club was founded in Casbah in 1937 as Union Sportive Musulmane d'Alger.

The matches between USM Alger and MC Oran combine two teams that are considered one of the biggest clubs in Algeria, and the first match between the two teams was on October 4, 1964, at Habib Bouakeul Stadium which ended in a 1–1 draw. In 1977 a sports reform was carried out as intended by the Ministry of Youth and Sports, in order to give the elite clubs a good financial base allowing them to structure themselves professionally (in ASP Which means Association Sportive de Performances). The aim was therefore that they should have full management autonomy with the creation of their own training center. Naftal (National Society of Marketing and Distribution of Petroleum Products) sponsors the club. Mouloudia changed its name and became Mouloudia Pétroliers d'Oran (MP Oran). as for USM Alger sponsors the club and change the name to Union sportive kahraba d'Alger (USK Alger), meaning electricity who had inherited the Société nationale de l'électricité et du gaz company (Sonelgaz). In 1981 they met for the first time in the Algerian Cup in the semi-finals which ended with USM Alger winning 2–1 to qualify for the final, where faced the neighbor of MC Oran ASM Oran and won to achieve their first title in the cup after seven defeats. In the Algerian Ligue Professionnelle 1, between 1975 and 1987, MC Oran had absolute control, as it was unbeaten against USM Alger in 13 matches. In the eighties the superiority was clear to MC Oran by winning several titles and reaching the final of the African Cup of Champions Clubs in 1989 Where they defeated against Raja Casablanca, As for USM Alger, its level was not stable despite winning the Algerian Cup in 1988 in the same tournament they met against MC Oran in the same round. In the nineties there was a convergence in the level despite the presence of USM Alger in the second division for five seasons.

Return after five seasons
In 1994 Saïd Allik became chairman of the board of directors of USM Alger and promised to return the team to Division 1, On May 26, 1995, USM Alger won against MC Ouargla and achieved an promotion challenge back to the Division 1 after five full seasons under the leadership of Younes Ifticène, Allik announce that USM Alger has returned to its normal place and will not fall again to the second division, In 1996–97 Championnat National the defending champion USM Alger was unable to maintain its title and there was a great conflict between CS Constantine and MC Oran, In the last round CS Constantine won at Stade Omar Hamadi against USM Alger and won the title taking advantage of MC Oran's stumble in Tlemcen, twenty-four years after Tahar Chérif El-Ouazzani stated that they were deprived of two championship titles because of USM Alger. and with the beginning of the millennium and for two decades there was a clear control of USM Alger, during which they achieved 13 titles and reached the final of the CAF Champions League for the first time and was defeated against TP Mazembe. On May 12, 2003, witnessed the heaviest result between the two teams where USM Alger won 8–2, which is the same season in which they achieved the league and cup double for the first time. On the contrary MC Oran did not achieve any title and fell for the first time to the second division in the 2007–08 season. And they met three times in the semi-finals of the Algerian Cup, all of which ended with the victory of USM Alger, the last final was in 2013 and ended with the goal of Noureddine Daham.

Second professional era (since 2010)

It was decided by the Ligue de Football Professionnel and the Algerian Football Federation to professionalize the Algerian football championship, starting from the 2010–11 season Thus all the Algerian football clubs which until then enjoyed the status of semi-professional club, will acquire the professional appointment this season. the president of the Algerian Football Federation, Mohamed Raouraoua, has been speaking since his inauguration as the federation's president in Professionalism, USM Alger become the first professional club in Algeria businessman Ali Haddad became the majority share owner after investing 700 million Algeria dinars to buy an 83% ownership in the club. On October 27, 2010, Haddad replaced Saïd Allik as president of the club. Allik had been the club's president for the past 18 years. On 27 September 2012, the National Society of Marketing and Distribution of Petroleum Products Naftal decided to a probable return to sponsoring the MC Oran after an absence of 24 years. As past, Naftal will sponsoring the all sport's sections of Mouloudia Club Oranais. 

On 6 January 2019, the Hyproc Shipping Company, a firm of the petroleum company Sonatrach signed a protocol and became MC Oran's sponsor. This initiative became after a long time of waiting the petroleum firm Naftal it's nine years ago. However same as Naftal, no final contract was concluded and Hyproc same as Naftal became a minor sponsors only. On June 2, 2019, it is official, the Haddad family is selling its 92% shareholding in SSPA USMA. It was the club's communication officer, Amine Tirmane, who announced it on the Echourouk TV. the reasons that made them make this decision is the imprisonment of club owner Ali Haddad and also freeze all financial accounts of the club. After it was expected that the USM Alger general assembly of shareholders will be on March 12, 2020, it was submitted to March 2, especially after the imprisonment of the former club president, Rabouh Haddad. The meeting witnessed the attendance of ETRHB Haddad representative and the absence of the amateur club president Saïd Allik, and after two and a half hours, it was announced that Groupe SERPORT had bought the shares of ETRHB Haddad which amounted to 94.34%.

A new appeal has been launched by the Wali of Oran Saïd Sayoud to the shareholders of the société sportive par actions (SSPA) of MC Oran in order to withdraw their share in the said company in favor of the club sportif amateur (CSA) to overcome the crisis that smolders. According to the same official, the SSPA/MCO is already in a “bankruptcy situation”, deploring the attitude of the shareholders who have completely abandoned the club, showing no desire to help it get out of the chaotic situation in which it is struggling. for quite some time. On February 21, In a statement made public on the official page of “the wilaya of Oran”, the wali declared his official withdrawal and his non-interference in the affairs of the MCO team. Despite the efforts and sincere intentions he has deployed, he has not, however, seen any real and serious will on the part of the club's leaders leading to a professional sporting project which reflects the ambitions of the supporters to see their club heart managed mat a national enterprise.

All-time head-to-head results

Honours

All-Time Top Scorers

Hat-tricks
A hat-trick is achieved when the same player scores three or more goals in one match. Listed in chronological order.

All-Time Top appearances
Bold Still playing competitive football in Algeria
since 1999–2000 season.
Statistics correct as of game on 2 October 2022

League matches

Algerian Cup results

Shared player history

Players who have played for both clubs

  Hocine Achiou (USM Alger 1996–06 & 2007–08 & 2009–11, MC Oran 2012–13)
  Mohamed Amine Aouamri (USM Alger 2009–11, MC Oran 2013–14)
  Youcef Belaïli (MC Oran 2010–12, USM Alger 2014–15)
  Farid Bellabès (MC Oran 2010–11 & 2012–present, USM Alger 2011)
  Abdelkader Benayada (MC Oran 2008–09, USM Alger 2009–11)
  Mohamed Benyahia (MC Oran 2015–16, USM Alger 2016–19)
  Yacine Bezzaz (USM Alger 2011–12, MC Oran 2014–15)
  Khaled Lemmouchia (USM Alger 2011–12, MC Oran 2015–16)
  Hamza Heriat (USM Alger 2010–11, MC Oran 2013–15 & 2016–20)
  Sofiane Hanitser (USM Alger 2007, MC Oran 2007–08)
  Hicham Belkaroui (USM Alger 2019–20, MC Oran 2020–21)

  Moulay Haddou (MC Oran 1993–04 & 2007–08, USM Alger 2004–07)
  Tarek Ghoul (USM Alger 1996–05, MC Oran 2005–06)
  Bouazza Feham (MC Oran 2006–08, USM Alger 2011–15)
  Salim Boumechra (USM Alger 2011–12, MC Oran 2012–13)
  Arslane Mazari (MC Oran 2012–13, USM Alger 2015–16)
  Ali Meçabih (MC Oran 1994–00 & 2002–03 & 2005–06, USM Alger 2004)
  Hichem Mezaïr (USM Alger 2000–04, MC Oran 2006–07 & 2008–09 & 2012)
  Hichem Mokhtari (USM Alger 2012–13, MC Oran 2013–14)
  Lahcène Nazef (USM Alger 2003–05, MC Oran 2006)
  Mohamed Amine Zidane (MC Oran 2003–05 & 2010–13, USM Alger 2005–07 & 2008–10)

Coaches who managed both clubs

  Jean-Michel Cavalli (MC Oran 2014–15 & 2019, USM Alger 2016)
  Abdelkader Amrani (USM Alger 2007, MC Oran 1998, 2022)
  Azzedine Aït Djoudi (USM Alger 2002–03, MC Oran 2021)

Algerian Ligue Professionnelle 1 results

The tables list the place each team took in each of the seasons.

References

MC Oran
USM Alger
Football rivalries in Algeria